The 1978–79 National Football League was the 48th staging of the National Football League (NFL), an annual Gaelic football tournament for the Gaelic Athletic Association county teams of Ireland.

Roscommon won their first and only NFL title with a win over Cork in the final.

Format

Knockout stage qualifiers
 Division One (North): top 3 teams
 Division One (South): top 3 teams
 Division Two (North): winners
 Division Two (South): winners

Group stage

Division One (South)

Table

Division Two (North) Final

Division Two (South) Final

Knockout stage

Quarter-finals

Semi-finals

Finals

References

National Football League
National Football League
National Football League (Ireland) seasons